Tatiana Huezo Sánchez (born 9 January 1972) is a film director of Salvadoran and Mexican nationality, residing in Mexico. Her first film,  (2011), a documentary about the Salvadoran Civil War, has been awarded internationally. In 2016 she premiered Tempestad, the story of two women who suffer the consequences of human trafficking in Mexico. It received the 2016 Fénix Award for Best Documentary.

Career
Born in El Salvador, Tatiana Huezo has lived in Mexico since she was four years old. She graduated from the Centro de Capacitación Cinematográfica (CCC), where she has since taught classes. In 2004 she completed a master's degree in creative documentary at Pompeu Fabra University in Barcelona.

In 1997 she shot the short Tiempo cáustico. Her feature film debut was El lugar más pequeño which premiered in 2011, a testimony to the experience of the civil war in El Salvador. It has received numerous awards and has been exhibited at more than 50 festivals around the world.

In 2015 Huezo presented Ausencias, a 27-minute short film that recounts the pain of Lulu, a mother who loses her husband and son, who have disappeared due to organized crime.

In her work, she has portrayed the impunity of people before justice and institutions, humanizing the victims. About Tempestad, Huezo said:

Tempestad, which received the 2016 Fénix Award for Best Documentary, tells the true story of Mexican women Miryam Carvajal – who spent almost a year incarcerated in Matamoros prison, accused of human trafficking, a crime she did not commit – and Aldela Alvarado, who is looking for her missing daughter. "What happens in Mexico is close to the civil war that is taking place in Central America," explains Huezo.

Filmography
 Tiempo cáustico (1997) 10-minute short. Directed.
 El ombligo del mundo (2001) 30-minute short. Directed and scripted.
 El lugar más pequeño (2011) 100-minute documentary. Directed.
 Ausencias (2015) 27-minute short. Directed.
 Tempestad (2016) 1 hour 45 minute documentary. Directed and scripted.
 Noche de fuego (2021)
 The Echo (2023 documentary film)

Awards and nominations

References

External links
 

1972 births
Best Director Ariel Award winners
Living people
Mexican documentary film directors
Mexican women film directors
People from San Salvador
Pompeu Fabra University alumni
Salvadoran film directors
Salvadoran women
Women documentary filmmakers